Raham Mihran was a powerful Iranian military officer from the House of Mihran. He is first mentioned during the Sasanian dynastic struggle of 457-459 between the two brothers Hormizd III and Peroz I. Raham was a supporter of Peroz I, who was also his protege, and played a key role in the dynastic struggle, defeating Hormizd's forces and crowning Peroz I as the new Sasanian king.

Sources 

 

5th-century Iranian people
Generals of Peroz I
5th-century deaths
Year of birth unknown
House of Mihran